Admiral Sir Charles Thomas Mark Pizey  (17 June 1899 – 17 May 1993) was a Royal Navy officer who served as the last Commander-in-Chief and first Chief of Naval Staff of the Indian Navy from 1951 to 1955.

Early life and career
Pizey was born in Axbridge, Somerset, the son of the Rev. Charles Edward Pizey (1853–1932), and Geraldine Fowle (1866–1949). He joined the Royal Navy in 1912 and served as a midshipman aboard HMS Conway and  during the First World War. Pizey then served as a First Lieutenant, first aboard  in the Atlantic Fleet from 1924 to 1925, and then aboard  in the Mediterranean from 1926 to 1927.

He was promoted to lieutenant commander on 15 December 1928. and served from 1929 to 1930 as Flag Lieutenant-Commander to Vice Admiral Sir W.A. Howard Kelly in the Mediterranean, aboard the battleship HMS Revenge. He was promoted to commander on 31 December 1933. From 1935 to 1937, he was the Executive Officer aboard  in the Mediterranean, and then commanded the destroyer  in the Home Fleet from 1938 to 1939.

Second World War

In June 1939, Pizey was promoted to captain. From 1939 to 1940, he commanded the armed merchant cruiser HMS Ausonia as part of the Atlantic convoys. From 1940 to 1942, he commanded the destroyer  in the Channel and North Sea, seeing action against the German battleships Gneisenau and Scharnhorst as well as the heavy cruiser Prinz Eugen, for which he was appointed a Companion of the Bath on 27 March 1942 and was also awarded a Distinguished Service Order (DSO) and was mentioned in despatches.

In July 1942, he was given the command of a destroyer depot ship, and served as a chief staff officer to a Rear Admiral in charge of protecting Soviet convoys in the North Sea. For this service, he was awarded a Bar to his DSO on 27 November 1942.

In December 1943, Pizey was appointed Director of Operations Division (Home) for the Admiralty, commanding HMS President. He served in this capacity until the end of the war.

Postwar career
In 1946, Pizey was appointed a commodore and appointed as Chief of Staff to the Commander-in-Chief, Home Fleet, serving aboard . He was promoted to rear admiral in 1948 and served as Senior Naval Liaison Officer and Chief of UK Services Liaison Staff, Australia, aboard HMS Terror (RN base, Singapore). From 1950 to 1951, he served as Flag Officer Commanding, First Cruiser Squadron, aboard HMS Liverpool. On 30 November 1951, he was promoted to vice admiral.

In October 1951, Pizey replaced Vice Admiral Edward Parry as the last Commander-in-Chief of the Indian Navy. He was knighted with the KBE in the Coronation Honours List of 1953, and was promoted admiral on 31 December 1954 (seniority from 16 December. In April 1955, Pizey became the first Chief of Naval Staff of the Indian Navy, which had replaced the former designation of Commander-in-Chief, Indian Navy. He was honoured with the Order of the People's Army upon the state visit of Josip Broz Tito to India.

Pizey was succeeded in his post by Vice Admiral Stephen Hope Carlill in July 1955. From later that year he served as Commander-in-Chief, Plymouth. He was promoted to a Knight Grand Cross of the Order of the British Empire in the 1957 New Year Honours, and retired in 1958. In 1962, he was appointed a Deputy Lieutenant of the County of Somerset.

Personal life and death
In 1928, Pizey married Phyllis May D'Angibau (27 November 1904 – 4 April 1993). The couple had two daughters:
 Pamela Mary, who married Lieutenant Commander James Barry Armstrong Hawkins MBE and 
 Sarah Margaret, who married Lieutenant Commander James Alexander Pountney Coats (1927–1993).

Sir Mark Pizey died at Burnham-on-Sea, Somerset on 17 May 1993, aged 93. His wife had died the previous month at the age of 88.

References

Knights Grand Cross of the Order of the British Empire
Companions of the Order of the Bath
Royal Navy admirals
1899 births
1993 deaths
Companions of the Distinguished Service Order
Royal Navy personnel of World War I
Royal Navy personnel of World War II
Military personnel from Somerset
Chiefs of the Naval Staff (India)